Weeping Wall is a geological formation found along Going-to-the-Sun Road in Glacier National Park, in the U.S. state of Montana. It is a natural waterfall that seeps out from the side of Haystack Butte and the Garden Wall, and is fed by runoff from snowmelt.

Landforms of Glacier National Park (U.S.)
Geology of Montana
Waterfalls of Glacier National Park (U.S.)
Landforms of Flathead County, Montana
Going-to-the-Sun Road